Kim Ji-yong (Hangul: 김지용; also known as Alexander Kim; born March 11, 1987), better known by his stage name Okasian (Hangul: 오케이션), is a Korean-American rapper and singer. He released his debut album, Boarding Procedures, on December 6, 2012. In May 2017, Okasian joined YG Entertainment's sub-label, THE BLACK LABEL

Discography

Studio albums

Mixtapes

Singles

Awards and nominations

References

External links

1987 births
Living people
People from Los Angeles
Rappers from Los Angeles
South Korean male rappers
South Korean hip hop singers
21st-century South Korean  male singers